Symbion Thermal Power Station is a  methane gas-fired thermal power plant located at the Cape of Busororo near the town of Nyamyumba in Rubavu District, in the Western Province of Rwanda.

Location

Overview
Kivu 56 Power Station is owned and operated by Symbion Power LLC, a private energy provider headquartered in the United States. The plant consists of two facilities: (a) an off-shore installation which extracts, separates and processes methane gas, which is dissolved in the deep waters of Lake Kivu, and then delivers it to (b) an on-shore generating facility located at Cape of Busororo, where the gas is used to turn gas turbines to generate electricity.

Symbion Power has registered a Rwandan subsidiary company that it owns 100 percent by the name Shema Power Lake Kivu Methane Limited, to design, fund, build, own, operate and maintain the Kivu 56 Power Station. Four gas turbines, each rated at 16 megawatts, power the plant to produce 56 megawatts of clean energy.

Construction 
According to the power purchase agreements signed between the relevant parties, the first  from this power station, are expected in 2018. In September 2017, Symbion sold US$100 million worth of equity in its two Rwandan projects; namely Kibuye Power Plant 1 and Kivu 56 Power Station. The money will be used to develop both power stations to generate a combined . A total of US$370 million is budgeted to fulfill that goal.

See also

References

External links
 Symbion Power Acquires Existing KP1 Power Plant On Lake Kivu, Increasing Investment Level To US$330 Million
 Lake Kivu’s Great Gas Gamble

Natural gas-fired power stations in Rwanda
Proposed natural gas-fired power stations